China, with one-fifth of the world's population, accounts for two-thirds of the world's reported aquaculture production.

Aquaculture is the farming of fish and other aquatic life in enclosures, such as ponds, lakes and tanks, or cages in rivers and coastal waters. China's 2005 reported harvest was 32.4 million tonnes, more than 10 times that of the second-ranked nation, India, which reported 2.8 million tonnes.

China's 2005 reported catch of wild fish, caught in rivers, lakes, and the sea, was 17.1 million tonnes. This means that aquaculture accounts for nearly two-thirds of China's reported total output.

The principal aquaculture-producing regions are close to urban markets in the middle and lower Yangtze valley and the Zhu Jiang delta.

Early history
Aquaculture began about 3500 BC in China with the farming of the common carp. These carp were grown in ponds on silk farms, and were fed silkworm nymphs and faeces. Carp are native to China. They are good to eat, and they are easy to farm since they are prolific breeders, do not eat their young, and grow fast. The original idea that carp could be cultured most likely arose when they were washed into ponds and paddy fields during monsoons. This would lead naturally to the idea of stocking ponds.

In 475 BC, the Chinese politician Fan Li wrote the earliest known treatise on fish farming, Yang Yu Ching (Treatise on fish breeding). The original document is in the British Museum.

During the Tang dynasty (618–907 AD), the farming of common carp was banned because the Chinese word for common carp (鯉) sounded like the emperor's family name, Li (李). Anything that sounded like the emperor's name could not be kept or killed. The ban had a productive outcome, because it resulted in the development of polyculture, growing multiple species in the same ponds. Different species feed on different foods and occupy different niches in the ponds. In this way, the Chinese were able to simultaneously breed four different species of carp, the mud carp, which are bottom feeders, silver carp and bighead carp, which are midwater feeders, and grass carp which are top feeders. Another development during the Tang dynasty was a fortunate genetic mutation of the domesticated carp, which led to the development of goldfish.

From 1368 AD, the Ming dynasty encouraged fish farmers to supply the live fish trade, which dominates Chinese fish sales to this day. From 1500 AD, methods of collecting carp fry from rivers and then rearing them in ponds were developed."

Recent history

The major carp species used traditionally in Chinese aquaculture are the black, grass, silver and bighead carp. In the 1950s, the Pearl River Fishery Research Institute of the Chinese Academy of Fishery Sciences (CAFS) made a technological breakthrough in the induced breeding of these carp, induced by injecting fish pituitary hormones.

In the past, fish culture in China has been a family business, with traditional techniques passed from generation to generation. However, in the late 1960s the Chinese government began a move to the modern induced breeding technologies, which has resulted in a rapid expansion of freshwater aquaculture in China.

From 1978, China's economic policies moved from central planning towards a market economy, opening new markets for aquaculture products. The effect of this, together with further technological advances, has been to move Chinese aquaculture towards industrial scale levels of production. In the 1980s, many species other than carp, such as other species of fish, crustaceans, molluscs and seaweeds, have been brought into production. However, in the late 1990s, CAFS scientists developed a new variant of the common carp called the Jian carp. This succulent fish grows rapidly and has a high feed conversion rate. Over 50% of the total aquaculture production of carp in China has now converted to Jian carp. By 2004, the induced breeding of carp had been so effective that the carp industry amounted to 46 percent of the total aquaculture output.

Statistics

Since 2002, China has been the world largest exporter of fish and fish products. In 2005, exports, including aquatic plants, were valued at US$7.7 billion, with Japan, the United States and the Republic of Korea as the main markets. In 2005, China was sixth largest importer of fish and fish products in the world, with imports totalling US$4.0 billion.

In 2003, the global per capita consumption of fish was estimated at 16.5 kg, with Chinese consumption, based on her reported returns, at 25.8 kg.

The common carp is still the number one fish of aquaculture.  The annual tonnage of common carp, not to mention the other cyprinids, produced in China exceeds the weight of all other fish, such as trout and salmon, produced by aquaculture worldwide.

Since the 1970s, the reform policies have resulted considerable development of China's aquaculture, both marine and inland. The total used for aquaculture went from 2.86 million hectares in 1979 to 5.68 million hectares in 1996. Over the same time span, production increased from 1.23 million tonnes to 15.31 million tonnes.

In 2005, worldwide aquaculture production including aquatic plants was worth US$78.4 billion. Of this, the Chinese production was worth US$39.8 billion. In the same year there were about 12 million fish farmers worldwide. Of these, China reported 4.5 million employed full-time in aquaculture.

Inland aquaculture
In 1979, inland aquaculture occupied 237.8 million hectares and produced 813,000 tonnes. In 1996, they occupied 485.8 million hectares and produced 10.938 million tonnes. In that year, 17 provinces produced 100,000 tonnes from inland aquaculture.

Pond culture is the most common method of inland aquaculture (73.9% in 1996). These ponds  are mostly found around the Pearl River basin and along the Yangtze River. They cover seven provinces: Anhui, Guangdong, Hubei, Hunan, Jiangsu, Jiangxi and Shandong. The government has also supported developments in rural areas to get rid of poverty. The sector is significant from a nutrition point of view, because it brings seafood to areas inland away from the sea where consumption of seafood has traditionally been low. Even the arid Xinjiang produced 58,835  tons of fish in 2000, 85% of it from aquaculture.

In recent times, China has extended its skills in culturing pond system to open waters such as lakes, rivers, reservoirs and channels, by incorporating cages, nets and pens.

Fish farming in paddy fields is also developing. In 1996, paddy fish farming occupied 12.05 million hectares producing 376,800 tonnes. A further 16 million hectares of paddy fields are available for development.

Species introduced from other parts of the world are also being farmed, such as rainbow trout, tilapia, paddle fish, toad catfish, silver salmon, river perch, roach and Collossoma brachypomum.

Besides fish and crustaceans, turtles (primarily, the Chinese soft-shelled turtle Pelodiscus sinensis) have been extensively farmed as well since the 1980s and 1990s. Based on a 2002 survey of 684 turtle farms, researchers estimated that these farms had the total herd of more than 300 million animals; they sold over 128 million turtles each year, with the total weight of about 93,000 tons, worth around US$750 million. Since these data are based on less than half of all turtle farms registered with the appropriate regulating agencies (i.e., 684 out of 1,499), it was estimated that the overall herds and production amounts are at least twice as high.

Marine aquaculture

Using current culture technologies, much farmed cultivation of marine plants and animals can be applied within the 10 metre isobath in marine environments. There are about 1.33 million hectares of marine cultivable areas in China, including shallow seas, mudflats and bays. Before 1980, less than nine percent of these areas were cultivated, and species were mainly confined to kelp, laver (Porphyra) and mussels.

Between 1989 and 1996, areas of cultivated shallow sea were increased from 25,200 to 114,200 hectares, areas of mudflat from 266,800 to 533,100 hectares, and areas of bay from 131,300 to 174,800 hectares. The 1979 production was 415,900 tonnes on 117,000 hectares, and the 1996 production was 4.38 million tonnes on 822,000 hectares.

Since the 1980s, the government has encouraged the introduction of different marine species, including the large shrimp or prawn Penaeus chinensis, as well as scallop, mussel, sea bream, abalone, grouper, tilapia and the mud mangrove crab Scylla serrata.

In 1989, production of farmed shrimp was 186,000 tonnes, and China was the largest producer in the world. In 1993 viral disease struck, and by 1996 production declined to 89,000 tonnes. This was attributed to inadequate management such as overfeeding and high stock densities.

Over-reporting

In 2001, the fisheries scientists Reg Watson and Daniel Pauly expressed concerns in a letter to Nature that China was over-reporting its catch from wild fisheries in the 1990s. They said that made it appear that the global catch since 1988 was increasing annually by 300,000 tonnes, whereas it was really shrinking annually by 350,000 tonnes. Watson and Pauly suggested this may have been related to Chinese policies where state entities that monitored the economy were also tasked with increasing output. Also, until more recently, the promotion of Chinese officials was based on production increases from their own areas.

China disputed this claim. The official Xinhua News Agency quoted Yang Jian, director general of the Agriculture Ministry's Bureau of Fisheries, as saying that China's figures were "basically correct". However, the FAO accepted there were issues with the reliability of China's statistical returns, and for a period treated data from China, including the aquaculture data, apart from the rest of the world.

See also
 Chinese Academy of Fishery Sciences
 Fishing industry in China

References

Further reading

 Tapiador DD, Henderson HF, Delmendo MN and Tsutsui H (1979) Freshwater fisheries and aquaculture in China FAO: Fisheries Technical Paper 168, Rome. .	
  Weimin Miao W and Xinhua Yuan X (2007) "The Carp Farming Industry in China - An Overview" In Leung P, Cheng-Sheng Lee C and O'Bryen PJ (Eds.) (2007) Species and System Selection for Sustainable Aquaculture Blackwell Publishing. .
 Zhijie G, Yingliang X, Xiangguo Z, Yong W, Daobo A and Sugiyama S (2008) Review of fishery information and data collection systems in China FAO Fisheries Circular No. 1029, p. 46. Rome. .

China
Industry in China
Fishing in China
Agriculture in China